Kerry Towle (born c. 1974) is a Canadian politician and former Member of the Legislative Assembly of Alberta representing the electoral district of Innisfail-Sylvan Lake and served as the Seniors Critic as a member of the Wildrose Alliance, before leaving the Wildrose Party on November 24, 2014 to join the Alberta Progressive Conservative Party.  Towle lost her reelection bid, to Don MacIntyre of the Wildrose, on May 5, 2015.

Before becoming a politician, Towle worked for both Indian and Northern Affairs, the David Thompson Health Region and was a turkey farmer with her husband Brad for five years. Towle also worked six years in real estate.

Political career
Towle's political career began in June 2011 when she won the candidacy for the Wildrose in Innisfail-Sylvan Lake, after citing the need to improve health care, to give a voice to grassroots Albertans and to protect property rights for landowners.

On April 23, 2012, Towle became MLA for Innisfail-Sylvan Lake, winning 46 per cent of the vote and defeating the incumbent PC MLA, Luke Ouellette.
Shortly after her election win, Towle was appointed Seniors Critic by Wildrose Leader Danielle Smith.

Upon becoming the Wildrose Seniors Critic, Towle was credited as being an effective advocate for Albertans by producing results for seniors on issues of quality of care at seniors facilities.  In early 2013, Towle went on a Seniors Tour across Alberta as part of the policy development process for the Wildrose heading into the 2016 election and to listen to concerns from seniors on quality of food in continuing care facilities, the one bath per week policy implemented by Alberta Health Services and the need for an independent seniors advocate.

On November 24, 2014, Towle left the Wildrose Party, crossing the floor of the Legislature to join the governing Progressive Conservative Party's caucus.

Later joined the Alberta Party.

Electoral history

References

External links
 

1970s births
Living people
Wildrose Party MLAs
Women MLAs in Alberta
Progressive Conservative Association of Alberta MLAs
21st-century Canadian politicians
21st-century Canadian women politicians
Alberta Party politicians